Chen Gang (born 1935) is a Chinese composer best known for his work Butterfly Lovers' Violin Concerto. He is the son of songwriter Chen Gexin. Chen Gang started to learn piano and composition from his father and music teachers from a young age.

From 1955 to 1959, Chen Gang was a student at the Shanghai Conservatory of Music, studying composition. In 1959, Chen Gang, together with another student, He Zhanhao, composed the violin concerto Butterfly Lovers.

The violin concerto won five Golden Record prizes as well as a Platinum Record prize. The Concerto has also achieved enormous international success. Chen is a professor at the Shanghai Conservatory of Music.

In his composition career, he composed and recomposed many classics in China, including Butterfly Lovers, Miaolin's Morning, and The Golden Steel Smelting Furnace. He also composed one of the most difficult violin solo pieces: Sun Shines in Tashkurgan.

References

Naxos description of Chen Gang
Chen Gang and Butterfly Lovers
An interview of China's Xinhua News Agency with Chen Gang

1935 births
Living people
Musicians from Shanghai
Shanghai Conservatory of Music alumni
Chinese classical composers